Musica Antiqua (Latin for early music) can refer to:

 Musica Antiqua Köln, early music ensemble founded in 1973
 Musica Antiqua Bruges, early music festival in Bruges, Belgium
 Ensemble Musica Antiqua, founded in 1958 by René Clemencic

See also
 Pro Musica Antiqua (disambiguation)